
Hrubieszów County is a unit of territorial administration and local government (powiat) in Lublin Voivodeship, eastern Poland, on the border with Ukraine. It was established on January 1, 1999, as a result of the Polish local government reforms passed in 1998.

As of 2019, its total population is 63,320, out of which the population of Hrubieszów is 17,634 and the rural population is 45,686.

Neighbouring counties
Hrubieszów County is bordered by Tomaszów Lubelski County to the south-west, Zamość County to the west and Chełm County to the north-west. It also borders Ukraine to the east.

Administrative division
The county is subdivided into eight gminas (one urban and seven rural). These are listed in the following table, in descending order of population.

References

 
Land counties of Lublin Voivodeship